Turkey women's junior national volleyball team is the women's under-20 and  under-19 national team formed by the Turkish Volleyball Federation (TVF) representing Turkey in international junior volleyball competitions like Women's Junior Volleyball World Championship with the U20 team and Women's Junior European Volleyball Championship with the U19 team.

The team became bronze medalist at the 2008 Women's Junior European Volleyball Championship and champion at the Women's Junior European Volleyball Championship in 2012.

The national team qualified for participation at the 2013 FIVB Women's Junior World Championship, and placed 5th.

Achievements

World Championship (U20 team)

European Championship (U19 team)

Squads
2012 European Championship — Gold medal
Damla Çakıroğlu, Çağla Akın, Kübra Akman, Şeyma Ercan, Ceylan Arısan, Ceyda Aktaş, Buket Yılmaz, Aslı Kalaç, Ece Hocaoğlu, Kübra Kegan, Sabriye Gönülkırmaz, Ecem Alıcı, Dilara Bağcı, Didem Marangoz. Head coach:  Gökhan Edman
2014 European Championship — Bronze medal
Melis Yılmaz, Cansu Özbay, Ayça Aykaç, Rida Erlalelitepe, Ada Germen, Aybüke Özdemir, Pelin Aroğuz, Hümay Topaloğlu, Yağmur Mislina Kılıç, Arelya Karasoy, Su Zent, Hande Baladin. Head coach:  Mustafa Suphi Doğancı
2020  European Championship — Gold medal
Sude Hacımustafaoğlu, Çağla Salih, Elif Su Eriçek, Lila Şengün, Hanife Nur Özaydınlı, İlayda Uçak, Sude Naz Uzun, İpar Özay Kurt, Aleyna Göçmen, Beren Yeşilırmak, Gülce Güçtekin, Melisa Ege Bükmen. Head coach:  Şahin Çatma

Current squad
.

Head coach:  Hasan Çelik
Assistant coach:  Yasin Gökgöz

C = Captain

See also
 Men's
Turkey Men's national volleyball team
Turkey Men's national volleyball team U23
Turkey Men's national volleyball team U21
Turkey Men's national volleyball team U19
 Women's
 Turkey Women's national volleyball team
Turkey Women's national volleyball team U23
Turkey Women's national volleyball team U20
Turkey Women's national volleyball team U18

References

National women's under-20 volleyball teams
V
Youth volleyball in Turkey
Youth National Team